Savius is a genus of leaf-footed bugs in the family Coreidae. There are about nine described species in Savius.

Species
These nine species belong to the genus Savius:
 Savius bergi Bergroth, 1905
 Savius buenoi Brailovsky, 1986
 Savius carayoni Brailovsky, 1986
 Savius diagonalis Berg, 1892
 Savius dilectus (Stål, 1862)
 Savius diversicornis (Westwood, 1842)
 Savius jurgiosus (Stål, 1862)
 Savius rufomarginatus Brailovsky, 1986
 Savius terrabus Brailovsky & Barrera, 2003

References

Further reading

External links

 

Discogastrini
Coreidae genera
Articles created by Qbugbot